Feyzabad-e Hajj Kazem (also Romanized as Feyẕābād-e Ḩājj Kāz̧em; also known as Feyzābād and Feyzābād Ḩājjī Kāz̧em) is a village in Baharestan Rural District, in the Central District of Nain County, Isfahan Province, Iran. At the 2006 census, its population was 158, in 53 families.

References 

Populated places in Nain County